The Shanay-Timpishka, also known as La Bomba, is a tributary of the Amazon River, called the "only boiling river in the world". The name means 'boiled by the heat of the sun', though the source of the heat is actually geothermal.

Location and mythology 
The river is located in the Mayantuyacu sanctuary, part of the Huánuco high forest. The area is inhabited by an Asháninka community. Local shamans believe that the boiling water is birthed by Yacumama, a giant serpent spirit known as the "Mother of the Waters."

Scientific explanation 
Andrés Ruzo, a geothermal scientist, has investigated the source of the heat. He initially learned of it as a child from his grandfather. The river maintains its high temperature despite not being near any known active volcanoes or geothermal vents, which normally provide geothermal heating for groundwater. Despite its unique nature, National Geographic has described it as an entirely natural feature: a non-volcanic, geothermal feature flowing at anomalously high rates. The predominant theory for the source of this heat is from the geothermal gradient of the Earth. Being closer to the Earth's mantle, underground water tends to be of a higher temperature than surface water. The theory is that rainwater falls onto the surface of the Amazon Rainforest and finds deep-rooted faults where it travels down into the crust. The water is thus heated in accordance with the geothermal gradient. It is then likely fed to the surface of the Earth through fault-fed hot springs that act to heat up the river along its stretch.

Threats 
The Shanay-Timpishka is facing threats from deforestation. According to National Geographic, it is in fact the local native population which carries out most of the deforestation around the area. Up to ninety-nine percent of deforestation around the Boiling River being caused by locals selling the larger and more expensive trees, then clear-burning the rest. A local oil and gas company called Maple Energy has in fact taken to protecting some of the jungle around the area.

External Link 
 Related TED talk on YouTube

References 

Tributaries of the Amazon River
Hot springs of South America